Matthew Carr Jr., known as CJ Carr, is an American professional basketball player who last played for Fjölnir of the Icelandic 1. deild karla.

Professional career
After going undrafted in the 2018 NBA draft, Carr signed with the German team BG Topstar Leitershofen of the 1. Regionalliga, the fourth tier basketball league in Germany. In his first professional game, he scored 30 points in a 80–83 loss to Rosenheim.

During the 2020–21 season, he played with Fjölnir of the Icelandic second-tier 1. deild karla. On March 12, 2021, he scored a career-high 42 points to go along with 14 assists in a 103–109 loss to the Breiðablik. For the season he averaged 29.2 points, 6.2 rebounds and 6.2 assists per game.

Professional career statistics

|-
| align="left" |  2018–19
| align="left" | BG Topstar Leitershofen
| 1. Regionalliga
| 24 || 34.9 || .478 || .396 || .818 || 4.8 || 4.2 || 2.5 || .2 || 26.0
|-
| align="left" |  2020–21
| align="left" | Fjölnir
| 1. deild karla
| 18 || 37.9 || .427 || .333 || .789 || 6.2 || 6.4 || 3.9 || .2 || 29.2
|-
|-class=sortbottom
| align="center" colspan=2 | Career
| All Leagues
| 42 || 36.2 || .454 || .368 || .804 || 5.4 || 5.2 || 3.1 || .2 || 27.4

References

External links
CJ Carr Profile at eurobasket.com
Missouri Southern Lions bio
Icelandic statistics at Icelandic Basketball Association

1995 births
Living people
American expatriate basketball people in Germany
American expatriate basketball people in Iceland
American men's basketball players
Basketball players from Illinois
Fjölnir men's basketball players
Missouri Southern Lions men's basketball players
Point guards
SIU Edwardsville Cougars men's basketball players
Sportspeople from Rock Island, Illinois